TANAP may refer to:

 Tatra National Park, Slovakia
 Trans-Anatolian gas pipeline

See also
 Tanzania National Parks Authority (TANAPA)